Gudrun Ure (born 12 March 1926) is a Scottish actress, most famous for her portrayal of the title character in Super Gran.

Biography 
Ure was born in Campsie, Stirlingshire. She starred in Orson Welles' 1951 stage production of Othello as Desdemona. She also starred in the pilot of a series called Life After Life, written by Yes Minister creator Jonathan Lynn. No further episodes, however, were made. She has also appeared in The 10th Kingdom as Mrs Murray, the mother of Tony Lewis' tyrannical boss and owner of their apartment building, T-Bag and the Pearls of Wisdom, Midsomer Murders, Casualty, The Crow Road and as Mrs. MacGregor in Second Thoughts in the episode Auld Acquaintance.

Ure's radio acting credits include the part of Joan Danbury, the mother of Inspector Gwen Danbury, in the eponymous police drama by Sue Rodwell broadcast on BBC Radio 4 between 2008 and 2010. She also portrayed the secretary of the central detective in the series Destination Fire (1962–66) on BBC radio. In a set of Encyclopædia Britannica-produced educational films about William Shakespeare's Macbeth, Ure played the role of Lady Macbeth.

Partial filmography
 36 Hours (1953)
 The Million Pound Note (1954)
 Doctor in the House (1954)
 The Diamond (1954)
 Trouble in the Glen (1954) (uncredited)
 The Sea Shall Not Have Them (1954)
 Othello (1952) - voice of Desdemona (1955 US cut only)
 Carry On Regardless (1961)

References

External links

1926 births
Living people
20th-century Scottish actresses
Scottish film actresses
Scottish television actresses